Operation Collie was a British naval operation in World War II, from 5–11 July 1945. Its objectives were, firstly, naval bombardment and aerial strikes on Japanese positions in the Nicobar Islands, particularly on Nancowry Island; secondly, providing cover for minesweeping operations in advance of a possible invasion; and thirdly, making carrier raids on Japanese airfields in northern Sumatra. These measures were a prelude for an invasion, Operation Zipper, which was never carried out due to the Surrender of Japan.

Operational detail
The carriers transported Grumman F6F Hellcats of the 884 Naval Air Squadron, which flew 82 sorties. Accounts of casualties vary, but one report indicates that two pilots were killed, one during take-off, one in action; and six aircraft were lost, three to enemy action; while another indicated that seven aircraft were lost from the Ameer, with all pilots rescued. Overall, the mission was a success, with one report noting that "three flotillas of minesweepers cleared 167 mines off the northwest coast of Malaya and from the waters around the Nicobars."

References

World War II operations and battles of the Southeast Asia Theatre
Naval aviation operations and battles
World War II aerial operations and battles of the Pacific theatre
Naval battles and operations of World War II involving the United Kingdom
Aerial operations and battles of World War II involving the United Kingdom